KBNU (93.9 FM) is a radio station licensed to Uvalde, Texas, United States. The station is currently owned by Javier Navarro Galindo, through licensee South Texas Radio, LLC.

History
On April 4, 2017, KBNU changed their format from classic rock to hot adult contemporary, branded as "Hits 93.9".

On June 29, 2022, KBNU ceased operations.

References

External links

BNU